The Ljubija mine is a large open pit mine  located in Prijedor, in the western part of Bosnia and Herzegovina in Republika Srpska, 48 km South - East of Banja Luka and 250 km South - East of the capital, Sarajevo. Ljubija represents the largest iron ore reserves in Bosnia and Herzegovina having estimated reserves of 442 million tonnes of ore. The mine produces around 2,900,000 tonnes of iron ore/year.
Iron ore is mined together with zinc, lead, baryte and fluorite.

History 
Ore mining in this location first began in 6th century BC. Modern industrial production was established in 1916.

References 

Iron mines in Bosnia and Herzegovina
Prijedor